New York University Press (or NYU Press) is a university press that is part of New York University.

History 
NYU Press was founded in 1916 by the then chancellor of NYU, Elmer Ellsworth Brown.

Directors 
 Arthur Huntington Nason, 1916–1932
 No director, 1932–1946
 Jean B. Barr (interim director), 1946–1952
 Filmore Hyde, 1952–1957
 Wilbur McKee, acting director, 1957–1958
 William B. Harvey, 1958–1966
 Christopher Kentera, 1966–1974
 Malcolm C. Johnson, 1974–1981
 Colin Jones, 1981–1996
 Niko Pfund, 1996–2000
 Steve Maikowski, 2001–2014
 Ellen Chodosh, 2014–present

Notable publications 
Once best known for publishing The Collected Writings of Walt Whitman, NYU Press has now published numerous award-winning scholarly works, such as Convergence Culture (2007) by Henry Jenkins, The Rabbi's Wife (2006) by Shuly Schwartz, and The Encyclopedia of Jewish Life Before and During the Holocaust (2002). Other well-known names published by the press include Cary Nelson, Jonathon Hafetz, Samuel R. Delany, and Mark Denbeaux.

See also

 List of English-language book publishing companies
 List of university presses

References

External links

Press
New York University academic journals
 
University presses of the United States
Book publishing companies based in New York (state)
Publishing companies based in New York City